Prince Madoc may refer to:

 Madoc, legendary Welsh explorer
 Madog ap Llywelyn, Welsh rebel